Philip Francis Brady (April 14, 1932 – September 5, 2003) was a Canadian diplomat. He was Chargé d'affaires a.i. to El Salvador. Born in Grand Rapids, Michigan, he spent his early years in Aylmer, Ontario. He received a diploma from the Ryerson Institute of Technology, an Honours B.A. (Business Administration) from University of Western Ontario, and an M.Sc. (Business Administration) and A.B.D. (Economics) from Columbia University. Brady then joined Canada's Department of External Affairs, and over the course of the next thirty five years spent a career traveling with External Affairs (San Jose, Costa Rica and Ottawa, Canada), C.I.D.A., I.D.R.C., and the United Nations (New York, USA and Geneva, Switzerland).

References 
 Foreign Affairs and International Trade Canada Complete List of Posts
 Obituary

1932 births
2003 deaths
Ambassadors of Canada to El Salvador